Arthrostylidium obtusatum is a species of Arthrostylidium bamboo in the grass family.

References 

obtusatum